Samuel Bleichröder (15 July 1779, Wriezen – 30 December 1855) was a German Jewish banker and financier. Located in Berlin, Bleichröder dealt with the Prussian court. He was also involved with the Rothschilds of Frankfurt.

In 1803, he established a banking firm that would merge in 1931, to create Arnhold and S. Bleichroeder.

His family originated from Bleicherode in Thuringia, hence the surname. Both his sons Gerson von Bleichröder and Julius Bleichröder became bankers.

References 

1779 births
1855 deaths
Bleichröder family
People from Wriezen
People from the Margraviate of Brandenburg
18th-century German Jews
Court Jews
German bankers
19th-century German businesspeople